Weird derives from the Anglo-Saxon word Wyrd, meaning fate or destiny. In modern English it has acquired the meaning of “strange or uncanny”. It may also refer to:

Places
 Weird Lake, a lake in Minnesota, U.S.

People
"Weird Al" Yankovic (born 1959), American musician and parodist

Art, entertainment, and media

Literature
 Weird US, a series of travel guides
 The Weird, a 2012 anthology of weird fiction
 Weird fiction, speculative literature written in the late 19th and early 20th century

Music
 "Weird" (Hanson song), 1998
 "Weird", a song from Hilary Duff's album Hilary Duff
 Weird!, a 2020 album by Yungblud
 New Weird America, a subgenre of psychedelic folk music of the mid-late 2000s

Other art, entertainment, and media
 Weird (comics), a fictional DC Comics character
 Weird: The Al Yankovic Story, a biographical comedy

Other uses
 WEIRD, an acronym for "Western, educated, industrialized, rich and democratic", cultural identifier of psychology test subjects
 Weird number, a natural number that is abundant but not semiperfect

See also
 Weirdo (disambiguation)